"True Blue" is an Australian folk song written and performed by singer-songwriter John Williamson. The lyrical content utilises Australian slang heavily, with the title meaning authentically Australian (from a British phrase).
The song was released in March 1982 as a single from True Blue - The Best of John Williamson, but failed to chart.

The lyrics included a reference to Vegemite, a food paste, but that was removed in a later version because Williamson "just didn't want the song to be commercialised". The 1986 version was used for the Australian Made campaign.

The song was adopted by the Australia national cricket team and the Australia national rugby union team as an unofficial theme song and is often performed at sporting events or other ceremonies.

Williamson performed the song twice on acoustic guitar at Australia Zoo during Steve Irwin's public memorial service (it was Irwin's favourite song); once shortly after the beginning ceremony, and again at the end as Irwin's truck was driven out of the Crocoseum (crocodile exhibit) for the final time.

In March 2009 Williamson sang in a 30-minute musical, The Story of True Blue, which relates how an Australian cattle dog loses its family in a bushfire. It was narrated by Shannon Noll, and combined stock men, livestock, motorbikes and circus performers.

In January 2018, as part of Triple M's "Ozzest 100", the 'most Australian' songs of all time, "True Blue" was ranked number 27.

Track listing

1986 version

In 1986, Williamson re-recorded "True Blue" and released it in September 1986 as the lead single from his sixth studio album Mallee Boy. The song was used for the Australian Made campaign. The song peaked at number 43 on the Kent Music Report.

At the 1988 APRA Awards (Australia), the song won Most Performed Australasian Country Work.

Charts

Track listing

Release history

References

External links
 Original lyrics broken link
 2003 lyrics broken link
 21st anniversary lyrics

1981 songs
1982 singles
1986 singles
John Williamson (singer) songs
APRA Award winners
Australian folk songs
Australian patriotic songs
Steve Irwin